Pseudophilautus oxyrhynchus, commonly known as sharp-snouted shrub frog, was a species of frog in the family Rhacophoridae.
It was endemic to Sri Lanka.

References

oxyrhynchus
Frogs of Sri Lanka
Endemic fauna of Sri Lanka
Extinct amphibians
Amphibian extinctions since 1500
Amphibians described in 1872
Taxa named by Albert Günther
Taxonomy articles created by Polbot